Halpenny is a surname. Notable people with the surname include:

Baron Barrymore Halpenny, Commercial Artist, book Editor, writer and historian of traditions and culture
Bruce Barrymore Halpenny, widely respected English military historian and author
Colum Halpenny, professional rugby league footballer
Ellen Halpenny (born 1990), New Zealand netball player in the ANZ Championship
Francess Halpenny, CC, FRSC (born 1919), Canadian editor and professor
Ernest Halpenny, PC (1903–1974), Canadian politician
Marion Rose Halpenny, equestrian writer and horsewoman
William Halpenny (1882–1960), Canadian track and field athlete